Dioscorus I, also known as Dioscorus the Great, was the pope of Alexandria and patriarch of the See of St. Mark who was deposed by the Council of Chalcedon in 451. He was recognized as patriarch by the Coptic Church until his death. He died in Gangra, Paphlagonia, in September 454. He is venerated as a saint by the Coptic and other Oriental Orthodox Churches.

Early life
Dioscorus was a Greek from Alexandria. He moved to Rome, under Pope Symmachus, as a refugee from Monophysite persecution and he rapidly established himself as a key figure in the papal court. Later on, Dioscorus served as the dean of the Catechetical School of Alexandria, and was the personal secretary of Cyril of Alexandria, whom he accompanied to the Council of Ephesus in 431. He eventually rose to the position of archdeacon.

Opposition to Nestorius
In his struggle against Nestorius, Cyril explained the union between the divine and human natures of Christ as "inward and real without any division, change, or confusion." He rejected the Antiochene theory of "indwelling,", or "conjunction" or "close participation," as insufficient. Thus the Alexandrian formula adopted by Cyril and Dioscorus was, in Greek, which translates into "one nature of God the Word Incarnate," by which Cyril meant "one nature"—that Christ is at once God and man. This formula explained Christ as existing in two natures, God and man.

Nestorius was condemned and deposed by the First Council of Ephesus, which approved of the Second Epistle of Cyril to Nestorius.

Patriarch of Alexandria
Dioscorus succeeded Cyril as Patriarch of Alexandria in the summer of 444. According to the deacon Ischyrion, Dioscorus had laid waste property, inflicted fines and exile, and bought up and sold at a high price the wheat sent by the government to Libya. According to Cyril's nephew, a priest named Athanasius, from the outset of his episcopate, Dioscorus harassed him and his brother by using influence with the court, so that the brother died of distress, and Athanasius, with his aunts, sister-in-law, and nephews, were bereft of their homes by the patriarch's malignity. Such accusations were readily made, and some allowance made for wrongs done by his agents that may have been in some cases unfairly called his acts. Still, it is but too likely that there was sufficient truth in them to demonstrate the effect on his character of elevation to a post of almost absolute power.

Reception of Eutyches
Eutyches was an archimandrite in Constantinople. In his opposition to Nestorianism, he seemed to take an equally extreme, although opposite view. Eutyches claimed to be a faithful follower of Cyril. In November 448, Flavian, Bishop of Constantinople held a synod regarding a point of discipline connected with the province of Sardis. Eutyches had been accusing various personages of covert Nestorianism, and at the end of the session of this synod one of those inculpated, Eusebius, Bishop of Dorylaeum, brought the question forward, and proffered a counter charge of heresy against the archimandrite. Eutyches was summoned to clarify his position regarding the nature of Christ. Finding his response unsatisfactory, the synod condemned and exiled Eutyches.

Eutyches appealed against this decision, labeling Flavian a Nestorian, and received the support of Dioscorus. In his famous Tome, Pope Leo I confirmed Flavian's theological position but as he concluded that Eutyches had erred through ignorance, he also requested that Eutyches should be readmitted if he repented.

"Robber synod"
Through the influence of the court official Chrysaphius, the godson of Eutyches, in 449, Emperor Theodosius II convened the Second Council of Ephesus. In remembrance of Cyril's role during the council of 431, the emperor asked Dioscorus to preside over the meetings. The council subsequently decided to reinstate Eutyches and to depose Flavian, as well as Eusebius of Dorylaeum, Theoderet of Cyrrus, Ibas of Edessa, and Domnus II of Antioch. Leo's legates protested but were ignored. Flavian was brutally treated, kicked, beaten, imprisoned, and soon exiled, and died from the effect of his injuries, three days after his deposition. He was regarded as a martyr for the doctrine of "the two natures in the one person" of Christ. Anatolius, who had been the agent (apocrisiarius) of Dioscorus at Constantinople, was appointed his successor.

Dioscorus and his council proceeded to depose Theodoret and several other bishops. Pope Leo called the council a "robber synod" and declared its decisions void. In the spring of 450 at Nicaea, Dioscorus, while on his way to the court, he caused ten bishops whom he had brought from Egypt to sign a document excommunicating Pope Leo.

Theodosius supported the council's decisions until he died on 28 July 450. His sister Pulcheria returned to power and made the officer Marcian her consort and emperor. She consulted with Pope Leo on convoking a new council, gathering signatures for his Tome to be introduced as the basic paper for the new council, but also insisted, against Leo's wishes, that the council should be held not in Italy but in the East. Meanwhile, the new imperial couple brought Flavian's remains back to Constantinople and exiled Eutyches to Syria.

Council of Chalcedon

The Council of Chalcedon in October 451 dealt with the Christological views of Eutyches but also with Dioscorus' views and earlier behaviour; specifically, his condemnation of the bishop Flavian in Ephesus II was questioned. When, at the Council of Chalcedon, he was asked why he had deposed Flavian, he, according to the minutes of Chalcedon, responded, "Flavian was deposed for this reason, that he spoke of two natures after the union. But I have quotations from the holy fathers Athanasius, Gregory and Cyril saying in numerous places that one should not speak of two natures after the union". 

At the council, Dioscorus expressed a willingness to condemn Eutyches. According to the minutes of the council of Chalcedon, Dioscorus stated: "If Eutyches holds opinions contrary to the doctrines of the church, he deserves not only punishment but hell fire. For my concern is for the catholic and apostolic faith and not for any human being."

The council deposed Dioscorus and other bishops that had been responsible for the decisions of 449 for violations of canon law rather than of heresy; Dioscorus had not attended the council of Chalcedon from the third session onward despite an imperial call to do so, which was a deposable offence. According to the minutes of the council of Chalcedon, Dioscorus had given the reason of ill health for his nonattendance from the third session. However, Oriental sources indicate otherwise that it was subterfuge. Whatever the real reason, the result of Dioscorus not being there saw him exiled to Gangra.

Exile
Following Dioscorus's deposition and exile, an Alexandrian priest named Proterius was appointed Patriarch in his stead, with the approval of the emperor. There was no public opposition to Proterius. Nonetheless, some Christians continued to support Dioscorus in secret, considering him the legitimate Patriarch.

Dioscorus died in exile in 454. When the news reached Egypt, his supporters assembled and elected Timothy, a disciple of his, to be the new Patriarch. Timothy immediately went into hiding, but was recognized among the Coptic inhabitants of the countryside, creating the split between the Coptic and the Melchite (i.e. Imperial) Church.

Legacy
Oriental Orthodox Churches remain in disagreement with Eastern Orthodox and Catholic churches regarding Dioscorus's character and positions. He is considered a saint by the Coptic, Syriac, and other Oriental Orthodox Churches, while Eastern Orthodox and Catholic churches have frequently deemed him a heretic.

Certain modern theologians suggest that both Leo and Dioscorus were orthodox in their agreement with Saint Cyril's Twelve Chapters, even though both have been (and still are) considered heretical by some. Some commentators like Anatolius and John S. Romanides argue that Dioscorus was not deposed for heresy but for "grave administrative errors" at Ephesus II, among which they mention his restoration of Eutyches, his attack on Flavian, and afterwards, his excommunication of Pope Leo I. Defenders of Dioscorus argue that Eutyches was orthodox at the time of his restoration and only later lapsed into heresy, that Flavian was a Nestorian, and that Pope Leo had supported Nestorianism.

Another controversial aspect of Dioscorus's legacy is the accusation, frequently levelled by Chalcedonian churches, that the Oriental Orthodox Churches accept Eutychianism. They deny this charge, arguing that they reject both the Monophysitism of Eutyches, whom they consider a heretic, as well as Dyophysitism espoused by the Council of Chalcedon, which they equate with Nestorianism, for a doctrine they term miaphysitism, or that in Jesus Christ, divinity and humanity exist as "one incarnate nature" (physis), as opposed to the orthodox Chalcedonian teaching of a divine and a human nature united in the one person (hypostasis) of Jesus Christ, fully God and fully man, a doctrine called the "hypostatic union".

In recent times, Oriental Orthodox churches have engaged in ecumenical dialogue with Catholic and Eastern Orthodox churches on the issues of Dioscorus's day. In May 1973 Pope Shenouda III of Alexandria visited Pope Paul VI in Rome and declared a common faith in the nature of Christ, the issue which caused the schism of the church in the Council of Chalcedon. A similar declaration was reached between the Oriental and Eastern Orthodox churches in 1990 in Geneva, in which both agreed in condemnation of the Nestorian and Eutychian "heresies" and in rejection of interpretations of ecumenical councils which do not fully agree with the Horos of the Third Ecumenical Council and the letter (433) of Cyril of Alexandria to John of Antioch. They also agreed to lift the anathemas and condemnations of the past. In the summer of 2001, the Coptic Orthodox and Greek Orthodox Patriarchates of Alexandria agreed to mutually recognize baptisms performed in each other's churches.

References

Sources
 
 St. Dioscorus, 25th Pope of Alexandria.

|-

|-

454 deaths
5th-century Oriental Orthodox archbishops
5th-century Christian saints
5th-century Popes and Patriarchs of Alexandria
Deans of the Catechetical School of Alexandria
Saints from Roman Egypt
Year of birth unknown
People declared heretics by the first seven ecumenical councils